German submarine U-1304 was a Type VIIC/41 U-boat of Nazi Germany's Kriegsmarine during World War II.

She was ordered on 2 April 1942, and was laid down on 17 May 1943, at Flensburger Schiffbau-Gesellschaft, Flensburg, as yard number 497. She was launched on 4 August 1944, and commissioned under the command of Oberleutnant zur See Walter Süss on 6 September 1944.

Design
German Type VIIC/41 submarines were preceded by the heavier Type VIIC submarines. U-1304 had a displacement of  when at the surface and  while submerged. She had two shafts and two  propellers.

U-1304 was fitted with five  torpedo tubes (four fitted at the bow and one at the stern), fourteen torpedoes, one  SK C/35 naval gun, (220 rounds), one  Flak M42 and two  C/30 anti-aircraft guns. The boat had a complement of between forty-four and fifty-two.

Service history
U-1304 was scuttled in Kupfermühle Bay near Flensburg on 5 May 1945 as part of Operation Regenbogen. Her wreck was raised and broken up later.

See also
 Battle of the Atlantic

References

Bibliography

German Type VIIC/41 submarines
U-boats commissioned in 1944
World War II submarines of Germany
1944 ships
Ships built in Flensburg
Operation Regenbogen (U-boat)
Maritime incidents in May 1945
U-boats scuttled in 1945